Drew C. French (born July 19, 1984) is an American baseball coach who is currently the bullpen coach for the Atlanta Braves of Major League Baseball (MLB).

Coaching career 
French was the head coach and camp coordinator of the Austin SLAM Baseball program while he was a relief pitcher at Concordia University Texas. He was named a volunteer assistant at Alabama in 2007 and was promoted to the Crimson Tide's director of baseball operations in 2009. He was named the pitching coach at Florida International in 2011, and at Lee University in 2014.

French joined the Houston Astros organization in 2016, and served as the pitching coach of the organization's Triple-A affiliate in 2019.

Atlanta Braves 
French was named the bullpen coach for the Atlanta Braves on December 18, 2020.

References

External links 
 

1984 births
Living people
People from Seguin, Texas
Sportspeople from Austin, Texas
Baseball players from Texas
Baseball coaches from Texas
Baseball pitchers
Concordia Tornados baseball players
Alabama Crimson Tide baseball coaches
FIU Panthers baseball coaches
Lee Flames baseball coaches
Atlanta Braves coaches